In Greek mythology, Alcimedes (Ancient Greek: Ἀλκιμέδης) may refer to the following two characters:

 Alcimedes, a variant of Alcimenes, a son Jason and Medea and brother of Tisander.
 Alcimedes, one of the Achaeans who fought in the Trojan war. He was a friend of the hero Ajax, son of King Oileus of Locris.

Notes

References 

 Diodorus Siculus, The Library of History translated by Charles Henry Oldfather. Twelve volumes. Loeb Classical Library. Cambridge, Massachusetts: Harvard University Press; London: William Heinemann, Ltd. 1989. Vol. 3. Books 4.59–8. Online version at Bill Thayer's Web Site
Diodorus Siculus, Bibliotheca Historica. Vol 1-2. Immanel Bekker. Ludwig Dindorf. Friedrich Vogel. in aedibus B. G. Teubneri. Leipzig. 1888–1890. Greek text available at the Perseus Digital Library.
Quintus Smyrnaeus, The Fall of Troy translated by Way. A. S. Loeb Classical Library Volume 19. London: William Heinemann, 1913. Online version at theio.com
 Quintus Smyrnaeus, The Fall of Troy. Arthur S. Way. London: William Heinemann; New York: G.P. Putnam's Sons. 1913. Greek text available at the Perseus Digital Library.

Children of Jason
Children of Medea
Achaeans (Homer)
People of the Trojan War
Corinthian characters in Greek mythology
Corinthian mythology